Euchlaena effecta, the effective euchlaena moth, is a species of moth of the family Geometridae. It is found in North America, including New Brunswick, Quebec and Ontario.

The wingspan is 40–47 mm.

References

Moths described in 1860
Angeronini